Pinni is a type of Punjabi and North Indian cuisine dish that is eaten mostly in winters. It is served as a dessert and is made from desi ghee, wheat flour, jaggery and almonds. Raisins may also be used. Urad dal pinni is a variety of pinni.

Pinni is also a general term for desserts or sweets prepared in a round shape.

Ingredients
For added flavor, khoya is used in the pinnis. 
Pinni is a joint sweet dish in North India and the Punjab region, also called pindi. 
Pinnis do not go bad for a lengthy time and do not require to be chilled. Pinnis are covered with crushed cardamom and preferably served warm with tea or warm dairy.

See also
 List of desserts

References

Punjabi cuisine
Indian desserts